Frontiers is a Canadian drama film, directed by Guy Édoin and released in 2023. The film stars Pascale Bussières as Diane Messier, a woman in the Estrie region of Quebec who has descended into anxiety and paranoia following a tragic accident, leading her mother Angèle (Micheline Lanctôt) to return from her retirement in Florida in an effort to help her.

The cast also includes Christine Beaulieu, Chimwemwe Miller, Marilyn Castonguay, Patrice Godin, Maxime de Cotret, Denis Larocque, Sylvain Massé, Marie-France Marcotte, Marie-Madeleine Sarr, and Mégane Proulx.

Production on the film began in Saint-Armand, Quebec in October 2021.

The film premiered on March 3, 2023 at the Rendez-vous Québec Cinéma.

References

External links
 

2023 films
2023 drama films
French-language Canadian films
Canadian drama films
2020s Canadian films
Films directed by Guy Édoin
Films shot in Quebec
Films set in Quebec